Joseph Alexander Harris (born December 6, 1952) is a former American football linebacker in the National Football League (NFL) for five different teams.  He was born in Fayetteville, North Carolina, and played college football at Georgia Tech.  He was inducted into the Georgia Tech Hall of Fame in 2000.

References

1952 births
Living people
sportspeople from Fayetteville, North Carolina
American football linebackers
Georgia Tech Yellow Jackets football players
Hamilton Tiger-Cats players
Washington Redskins players
San Francisco 49ers players
Minnesota Vikings players
Los Angeles Rams players
Baltimore Colts players
Washington Federals/Orlando Renegades players